Jalmenus eichhorni, the northern hairstreak or northern imperial blue, is a butterfly of the family Lycaenidae. It is endemic to Queensland, Australia, including Cape York.

The wingspan is about 30 mm.

The larvae feed on a various Acacia species, including A. crassicarpa, A. leptocarpa, A. humifusa and A. holosericea.

The caterpillars are attended by the ant species Iridomyrmex gracilis, Iridomyrmex reburrus and Iridomyrmex sanguineus.

External links
Australian Insects 
Australian Faunal Directory

Theclinae
Taxa named by Otto Staudinger
Taxa described in 1888